Moataz Al-Baqaawi (born 4 January 1998) is a Saudi Arabian professional footballer who plays as a goalkeeper for Pro League side Al-Tai.

Club career
Al-Baqaawi started his career at hometown club Al-Lewaa before joining Al-Taawoun on 21 November 2013. He signed his first professional contract with the club on 11 June 2017. He was promoted to the first team during the 2018–19 season. Al-Baqaawi finally made his debut on 21 November 2021 in the 3–0 defeat to Al-Batin. On 13 July 2022, Al-Baqaawi joined Al-Tai on a free transfer.

References

External links 
 

1998 births
Living people
People from Ha'il Province
Association football goalkeepers
Saudi Arabian footballers
Saudi Arabia youth international footballers
Al-Lewaa Club players
Al-Taawoun FC players
Al-Tai FC players
Saudi Professional League players